Vidua is a genus of passerine birds in the family Viduidae.

The genus was introduced by the French naturalist Georges Cuvier in 1816. The type species was subsequently designated as the pin-tailed whydah. The name Vidua is a Latin word meaning "widow".

The genus contains 19 species:

References

 
Bird genera
Taxa named by Georges Cuvier